A graph reduction machine is a special-purpose computer built to perform combinator calculations by graph reduction.

Examples include the SKIM ("S-K-I machine") computer, built at the University of Cambridge Computer Laboratory, and the multiprocessor GRIP ("Graph Reduction In Parallel") computer, built at University College London.

See also
SECD machine

References
T. J. W. Clarke, P. Gladstone, C. MacLean, A. C. Norman: SKIM — The S, K, I Reduction Machine. LISP Conference, 1980: 128–135

External links
Reduction Machines, Parallel Functional Programming: An Introduction, Kevin Hammond

Applicative computing systems
Functional programming
University of Cambridge Computer Laboratory